Abida ateni is a species of air-breathing land snail, a terrestrial pulmonate gastropod mollusc in the family Chondrinidae.

Geographic distribution
A. ateni is endemic to France, where it occurs only at three locations in the Aspe valley, in the Western Pyrenees (Pyrénées-Atlantiques).

Ecology 
A. ateni is a rock-dwelling species of land snail. It lives on limestone in valley habitats at 300–400 m altitude.

Conservation 
A. ateni is listed as vulnerable (VU) in the IUCN Red List of Threatened Species. The species is protected under the French law; however, there is no specific conservation plan for it.

See also 
List of non-marine molluscs of Metropolitan France

References

Chondrinidae
Endemic molluscs of Metropolitan France
Gastropods described in 1973